The 2022 Le Mans Cup, known as the 2022 Michelin Le Mans Cup under sponsorship, was the seventh season of the Le Mans Cup. It began on 16 April at the Circuit Paul Ricard and ended on 15 October at the Algarve International Circuit. The series is open to Le Mans Prototypes in the LMP3 class, and grand tourer sports cars in the GT3 class.

Calendar
The 2022 calendar was unveiled on 17 September 2021.

Entries

LMP3
All cars in the LMP3 class used the 2020 spec Nissan VK56DE 5.6L V8 engine and Michelin tyres. The new-for-2022 race length of 1h 50m removes the need for the additional mandatory stop that was introduced in 2020 to mitigate unexpected higher fuel consumption.

GT3

Race results

Bold indicates the overall winner.

Standings
Points are awarded according to the following structure:

LMP3 Teams Championship

GT3 Teams Championship

LMP3 Drivers Championship

GT3 Drivers Championship

References

External links
 

2022 in motorsport
2022 in European sport